The American Institute of Mathematics (AIM) is one of eight mathematical institutes in the United States, funded by the National Science Foundation (NSF). It was founded in 1994 by John Fry, co-founder of Fry's Electronics, and originally located in the Fry's Electronics store in San Jose, California. It was privately funded by Fry at inception, and obtained NSF funding starting in 2002. From 2023 onwards, the institute will be located on the campus of the California Institute of Technology in Pasadena, California.

History
The institute was founded with the primary goal of identifying and solving important mathematical problems. Originally very small groups of top mathematicians would be assembled to solve a major problem, such as the Birch and Swinnerton-Dyer conjecture. Later, the institute began running a program of week-long workshops on current topics in mathematical research. These workshops rely strongly on interactive problem sessions.

Brian Conrey became the institute's director in 1997.

From 1998 to 2009 (with the exception of 1999), AIM annually awarded a five-year fellowship to an "outstanding new PhD pursuing research in an area of pure mathematics", but currently is not offering the fellowship.  AIM also sponsors local mathematics competitions and a yearly meeting for women mathematicians.

The institute planned to move to Morgan Hill, California, about 39 miles (63 km) to the southeast of San Jose, when its new facility is completed.  Plans for the new facility were started about 2000, but construction work was delayed by regulatory and engineering issues. In February 2014, the AIM received permission to start construction of the facility, which will be built as a facsimile of The Alhambra, a 14th-century Moorish palace and fortress in Spain, but as of August 2017, no construction activity had started.

On March 24, 2022, the institute announced its relocation to the California Institute of Technology (Caltech).

Sponsored research 
The American Institute of Mathematics has sponsored fundamental research for high-profile problems in several mathematical areas. Among them are:

Combinatorics
 The strong perfect graph theorem — proved in 2003 by Maria Chudnovsky, Neil Robertson, Paul Seymour, and Robin Thomas
 Hadwiger's conjecture — research by Neil Robertson and Paul Seymour.

Representation theory
 Atlas of Lie groups and representations, a massive project to compute the unitary representations of Lie groups.  The computations have been done for the exceptional Lie group E8.

References

External links
 

Research institutes in the San Francisco Bay Area
National Science Foundation mathematical sciences institutes
Organizations based in San Jose, California
Organizations established in 1994
Research institutes established in 1994
1994 establishments in California
1990s in mathematics